Berkswell railway station, in the West Midlands of England, takes its name from the nearby village of Berkswell although it is located on the northern edge of the village of Balsall Common. The station originally opened in 1844 as Docker's Lane, changed to Berkswell on 1 January 1853, then to Berkswell & Balsall Common on 1 February 1928 before reverting to Berkswell again in 1955. 

It is situated on the West Coast Main Line between Birmingham and Coventry, specifically between the stations of Hampton-in-Arden and Tile Hill (in west Coventry). The station and all trains serving it are operated by West Midlands Railway, while Avanti West Coast pass through the station without stopping. There are small lakes and a river on the Eastern side of the railway station.

History
In 2004, as part of a plan to upgrade the line to carry more high speed trains, the level crossing situated to the east of the station was removed and two small low parallel tunnels were built under the railway, one for road traffic and the other for pedestrians. The road tunnel, being too narrow for two-way traffic, is controlled by traffic lights. The level crossings at Tile Hill and Canley were also removed in the upgrade.

Berkswell was once the junction with a line that ran to Kenilworth, which opened on 2 March 1884 and closed to all traffic on 3 March 1969. The trackbed of this line is gradually being converted into a "Greenway" for walking, cycling, and horse-riding. The route for the proposed High Speed 2 line will lie broadly parallel to this greenway, thus necessitating its realignment through and north-west of the village of Burton Green. A length of track of the Kenilworth line survives as a siding. It was occasionally used for stabling the Royal Train. Even though the station is situated in the far larger community of Balsall Common, there are currently no plans to revert its name back to the more accurate ‘Berkswell & Balsall Common’.

Facilities
The station has a ticket office located on platform 1 which is open Monday-Thursday 07:00-13:00, Friday 07:00-13:00 and 15:00-21:00, Saturday 08:00-16:00 and Sunday 10:00-16:30. When the ticket office is open tickets must be purchased before boarding the train. Outside of these times there is a ticket machine in the waiting room on platform 1 which accepts card payments only - cash and voucher payments can be made to the senior conductor on the train. When the waiting room is closed, tickets must be purchased from the ticket office (if open) or from the senior conductor on the train.

There is a free car park for rail users on Station Road. Cycle parking is also available.

Step free access is available between the platforms via the public subway on Station Road. Station staff provide information and assistance whilst the ticket office is open. Outside of these hours information is available from help points located on both platforms and from the senior conductor on the train. Berkswell station is accredited by the Secure Station Scheme.

Services
Berkswell is served by two trains per hour each way, to  northbound and to  via  southbound. There are extra services towards  in the morning peak.

All services are operated by West Midlands Trains. Most services are operated under the London Northwestern Railway brand but some services (mainly early morning and late night services which start/terminate at ) operate under the West Midlands Railway brand.

References

External links

Photographs of Berkswell station at warwickshirerailways.com

Railway stations in Solihull
DfT Category E stations
Former London and North Western Railway stations
Railway stations in Great Britain opened in 1844
Railway stations served by West Midlands Trains
1844 establishments in England